Controlling Crowds – Part IV is the seventh studio album by the London-based trip hop progressive and alternative band Archive. It was released worldwide on 19 October 2009.

This is the sequel of Controlling Crowds which contains parts I to III. Both albums were released on the same day as a double CD under the name Controlling Crowds - The Complete Edition Parts I–IV.

Track listing
 "Pills" - 4:11
 "Lines" - 6:04
 "The Empty Bottle" - 7:03
 "Remove" - 4:06
 "Come on Get High" - 4:41
 "Thought Conditioning" - 3:39
 "The Feeling of Losing Everything" - 4:48
 "Blood in Numbers" - 3:05
 "To the End" - 3:55
 "Pictures" - 3:55
 "Lunar Bender" - 3:24

Charts

References

2009 albums
Archive (band) albums